Lozivskyi is an urban-type settlement in Alchevsk Raion (district) in Luhansk Oblast of eastern Ukraine. Population:

Demographics
Native language distribution as of the Ukrainian Census of 2001:
 Ukrainian: 24.17%
 Russian: 75.51%
 Others 0.18%

References

Urban-type settlements in Alchevsk Raion